Sugar Creek is a stream in the U.S. state of Georgia. It is a tributary to the Toccoa River.

The name Sugar Creek comes from the Cherokee Indians of the area, on account of the Honey locust trees near the stream's banks.

References

Rivers of Georgia (U.S. state)
Rivers of Fannin County, Georgia
Rivers of Gilmer County, Georgia